Madak may refer to:
 Madak, Kurdistan